Wicket has several meanings in the game of cricket.

Wicket may also refer to:

Fictional characters
 Wicket W. Warrick, in Star Wars
 Mrs. Wicket, in Mr. Bean
 Wickets, characters in Regular Show

Other uses
 Wicket (ski), to attach a lift ticket 
 Wicket (sport), a North American historical version of cricket
 Wicket gate, or wicket, a pedestrian door or gate
 Wicket gate, a component of a water turbine
 Wicket, or paddle, part of a lock gate on waterways
 Apache Wicket, a web application framework 
 Croquet hoop, known as wicket in the U.S.

See also

Sticky wicket
Wickett, Texas